Patagonotothen elegans is a species of marine ray-finned fish, belonging to the family Nototheniidae, the notothens or cod icefishes. It is native to the waters off southern South America in both the southeastern Pacific Ocean and the southwestern Atlantic, including the Falkland Islands.

References

External links 

elegans
Fish described in 1880
Taxa named by Albert Günther

Fish of the Southern Ocean